A shath  ( šaṭḥ, plural: šaṭaḥāt or šaṭḥiyyāt), in the Islamic mystical tradition of Sufism, is an ecstatic utterance which may be outrageous in character. The word is derived from the root š-ṭ-ḥ, which carries the sense of overflowing or outpouring caused by agitation.  Famous shathiyat include “Glory be to me, how great is my majesty” by Bayazid Bastami and “I am the Truth” by Mansur Al-Hallaj.
Sufi authors sometimes claimed that such utterances were misquotations or attributed them to immaturity, madness, or intoxication. At other times they regarded them as authentic expressions of spiritual states, even profoundest experience of divine realities, which should not be manifested to the unworthy. Many Sufi authors, including al-Ghazali, showed ambivalence about apparently blasphemous nature of some shathiyat, while admiring the spiritual status of their authors.

The heyday of shath occurred during the classical period of Sufism from the ninth to twelfth century AD (the third to sixth century AH). The principal Sufi interpretation of the shathiyat which took the form of "I am" sayings contrasted the permanence of God (baqā’) with the mystical annihilation of the individual ego (fanā’), which made it possible for God to speak through the individual. They later figured as topoi of Persian Sufi poetry (especially that of Farid al-Din Attar) before being reduced by later Sufis to mere allegories for Ibn Arabi's philosophy.

Because the legal notion of blasphemy was not clearly defined in Islamic law, shathiyat were treated inconsistently by legal authorities. In practice, since apostasy was subsumed in the category of zandaqa, which reflected the Zoroastrian legacy of viewing heresy as a political crime, shathiyat were prosecuted only when it was desired by political authorities. Thus, such prosecutions mostly  resulted from “personal vendetta, subversion of the state and party factionalism”. Because of their opposition to religious norms, these ecstatic utterances play an important role in the conception of Islamic Antinomianism.

See also
Ayn al-Quzat Hamadani
Crazy wisdom
Divine ecstasy
Ruzbihan Baqli
Sarmad Kashani

Notes

Bibliography

 

Islamic terminology
Sufism
Ancient Persian mystical literature